Väheru is a village in Valga Parish, Valga County, in southeastern Estonia. It has a population of 83 (as of 1 January 2004).

Väheru has a station on currently inactive Valga–Pechory railway.

References

Villages in Valga County